Appleby East railway station is a closed railway station that was situated on the Eden Valley Railway between Kirkby Stephen East and Penrith in Cumberland (now in Cumbria), England. The station was formerly one of two that served the town of Appleby-in-Westmorland, the other being Appleby West station on the Midland Railway's Settle to Carlisle line. The latter station is still open, albeit now simply called Appleby station.

History
Opened by the Eden Valley Railway, it became part of the London and North Eastern Railway during the Grouping of 1923. Passing to the Eastern Region of British Railways on nationalisation in 1948, it was then closed by the British Transport Commission.

The site today
The station is fairly intact and is used by a scrap merchant.

In 1995, the Eden Valley Railway Society was formed with the aim of restoring the line and reintroducing a train service. The society, now renamed the Eden Valley Railway Trust, now operates a heritage service from Warcop station, and is upgrading the track towards Appleby East for public service.

References

External links
 Station on navigable O.S. map. Northerly of the two stations.
 Cumbria's Lost Railways - Appleby East Station
Appleby and the Eden Valley Railway

Disused railway stations in Cumbria
Former North Eastern Railway (UK) stations
Railway stations in Great Britain opened in 1862
Railway stations in Great Britain closed in 1962
Appleby-in-Westmorland
1862 establishments in England